Bronx Skate Park (commonly known as Allerton Skate Park) is a  skate park inside Bronx Park, a little north of Allerton Avenue, in The Bronx, New York City. The park includes a smooth skating surface, as well as being equipped with a quarter pipe, bank ramps with ledges, skate pyramid, and grind rails.  , it is one of six skate parks in The Bronx run by NYC Parks.

Park history 
The skate park was opened in June 2008, as part of a $1.4 million renovation of Bronx Park which also included a new synthetic turf soccer field.   Prior to its construction, the nearest skate park was in Throggs Neck.  The skate park was originally proposed by the manager of a nearby McDonald's restaurant three years earlier; he saw that local kids were skateboarding in the restaurant's parking lot, and worried for their safety.  The renovation project led to Bronx Park being named "Park of the Month" for September 2009.

Future remodel 
In 2014, local resident Ron Cicatelli suggested replacing the city-run facility with an improved area using private funding.  Cicatelli called the current park "outdated", and "stuck in the Stone Age".  He proposed replacing it with a new design by Steve Rodriguez.  Rodriguez, known as "Mayor of NYC Skate Parks", had previously designed skate parks on the Lower East Side and on River Avenue in the south Bronx.  The proposal was approved by Community Board 11, but , was pending approval by the parks department.  According to Cicatelli, the redesign would make the park a "destination", and would be of benefit to local business by bringing in additional traffic from the train.

Recognition 
In 2018, Vlad Gomez, co-founder of the Public Housing Skate Team, cited Allerton Skate Park as one of the two major skate parks in The Bronx.

References

External links 

 Ghetto Community's Atown Vibez, in-line skating video shot at Allerton Skate Park.

Skateparks in New York City
Parks in the Bronx
2008 establishments in New York City